Literature of the 19th century refers to world literature produced during the 19th century. The range of years is, for the purpose of this article, literature written from (roughly) 1799 to 1900. Many of the developments in literature in this period parallel changes in the visual arts and other aspects of 19th-century culture.

Literary realism
Literary realism is the trend, beginning with mid nineteenth-century French literature and extending to late-nineteenth- and early-twentieth-century authors, toward depictions of contemporary life and society as it was, or is. In the spirit of general "realism," realist authors opted for depictions of everyday and banal activities and experiences, instead of a romanticized or similarly stylized presentation.

Anglophones
Lionel Stevenson wrote that "The most explosive impact in English literature during the nineteenth century is unquestionably Thomas Carlyle's. From about 1840 onward, no author of prose or poetry was immune from his influence."

George Eliot's novel Middlemarch stands as a great milestone in the realist tradition. It is a primary example of nineteenth-century realism's role in the naturalization of the burgeoning capitalist marketplace.

William Dean Howells was the first American author to bring a realist aesthetic to the literature of the United States. His stories of 1850s Boston upper-crust life are highly regarded among scholars of American fiction. His most popular novel, The Rise of Silas Lapham, depicts a man who falls from materialistic fortune by his own mistakes. Stephen Crane has also been recognized as illustrating important aspects of realism to American fiction in the stories Maggie: A Girl of the Streets and The Open Boat.

Latin American Literature 
Adventure novels about the gold rush in Chile in the 1850s, such as Martin Rivas by Alberto Blest Gana, and the gaucho epic poem Martin Fierro by Argentine José Hernández are among the iconic and populist 19th century literary works written in Spanish, published in Latin America.

Zenith
Honoré de Balzac is often credited with pioneering a systematic realism in French literature, through the inclusion of specific detail and recurring characters. Fyodor Dostoyevsky, Leo Tolstoy, Gustave Flaubert, and Ivan Turgenev are regarded by critics such as FR Leavis as representing the zenith of the realist style with their unadorned prose and attention to the details of everyday life. In German literature, 19th-century realism developed under the name of "Poetic Realism" or "Bourgeois Realism," and major figures include Theodor Fontane, Gustav Freytag, Gottfried Keller, Wilhelm Raabe, Adalbert Stifter, and Theodor Storm. Later "realist" writers included Benito Pérez Galdós, Nikolai Leskov, Guy de Maupassant, Anton Chekhov, José Maria de Eça de Queiroz, Machado de Assis, Bolesław Prus and, in a sense, Émile Zola, whose naturalism is often regarded as an offshoot of realism.

People

Leopoldo Alas
Louisa May Alcott
Hans Christian Andersen
Machado de Assis
Jane Austen
Gertrudis Gómez de Avellaneda
Gustavo Adolfo Bécquer
Honoré de Balzac
Alberto Blest Gana
Elizabeth Barrett Browning
Charles Baudelaire
Richard Beatniffe
Anne Brontë
Charlotte Brontë
Emily Brontë
Georg Büchner
Ivan Bunin
Lord Byron
Hall Caine
Lewis Carroll
Thomas Carlyle
Rosalía de Castro
François-René de Chateaubriand
Anton Chekhov
Kate Chopin
Samuel Taylor Coleridge
James Fenimore Cooper
Stephen Crane
Eduard Douwes Dekker
Emily Dickinson
Charles Dickens
Fyodor Dostoevsky
Arthur Conan Doyle
Alexandre Dumas, père
Alexandre Dumas, fils
Paul Dunbar
José Maria Eça de Queirós
José Echegaray
George Eliot (Mary Ann Evans)
Ralph Waldo Emerson
Gustave Flaubert
Theodor Fontane
Margaret Fuller
Elizabeth Gaskell
Johann Wolfgang von Goethe
Nikolai Gogol
Manuel González Prada
Juana Manuela Gorriti
Brothers Grimm
Henry Rider Haggard
Ida Gräfin Hahn-Hahn
Thomas Hardy
Francis Bret Harte
Nathaniel Hawthorne
Friedrich Hölderlin
Heinrich Heine
Victor Hugo
Henrik Ibsen
Washington Irving
Henry James
John Keats
Gottfried Keller
Rudyard Kipling
Caroline Kirkland
Jules Laforgue
Giacomo Leopardi
Mikhail Lermontov
Nikolai Leskov
Stéphane Mallarmé
Alessandro Manzoni
José Martí
Clorinda Matto de Turner
Herman Melville
Guy de Maupassant
John Neal
Friedrich Nietzsche
José María de Pereda
Benito Pérez Galdós
Edgar Allan Poe
Marcel Proust
Bolesław Prus
Aleksandr Pushkin
Fritz Reuter
Arthur Rimbaud
John Ruskin
George Sand (Amandine-Aurore-Lucile Dupin)
Mary Shelley
Percy Shelley
Henryk Sienkiewicz
Stendhal (Marie-Henri Beyle)
Robert Louis Stevenson
Adalbert Stifter
Bram Stoker
Theodor Storm
Harriet Beecher Stowe
Alfred, Lord Tennyson
Henry David Thoreau
Leo Tolstoy
Ivan Turgenev
Mark Twain
Juan Valera y Alcalá-Galiano
Giovanni Verga
Paul Verlaine
Jules Verne
Lew Wallace
H. G. Wells
Edith Wharton
Walt Whitman
Jack London
Oscar Wilde
William Wordsworth
Émile Zola
José Zorrilla

By language
 Golden Age of Russian Poetry
 19th-century French literature

By year
1800s – 1810s – 1820s – 1830s – 1840s – 1850s – 1860s – 1870s – 1880s – 1890s – 1900s

See also
19th century#Literature
Kailyard school
19th century in poetry

References

External links

 
History of literature